Chervotkin is a Russian masculine surname, its feminine counterpart is Chervotkina. Notable people with the surname include:

Aleksey Chervotkin (born 1995), Russian cross-country skier
Nelli Chervotkina (born 1965), Soviet pair skater

Russian-language surnames